Sam McNicol (born 6 October 1995) is a New Zealand rugby union player who played as an outside back for Wellington and  in New Zealand's domestic Mitre 10 Cup and the Hurricanes and  in the international Super Rugby competition.

Early career

Born in Feilding in New Zealand's Manawatu District, McNicol attended school further north in the town of Napier where he played first XV rugby for the local Napier Boys' High School.

Senior career

Originally named in the Wellington Lions squad for the 2014 ITM Cup, the then 19-year old McNicol didn't get any game time due to having to undergo double hip surgery and had to wait until the following year to make his provincial debut.   A fractured eye-socket limited him to just 4 appearances during what was to prove to be his final season in Wellington.

He moved back to Napier in 2016 to join newly promoted Mitre 10 Cup Premiership side, the Hawke's Bay Magpies.   Unfortunately, injury struck again and he was forced to miss the entire season as his new club slipped to relegation back to the Championship for 2017.

Super Rugby

Despite having no senior provincial rugby experience under his belt, McNicol was called into the  wider training group during the 2015 Super Rugby season and made one appearance, against the Chiefs in New Plymouth. 2016 saw him earn his first full Super Rugby contract, this time with the Hamilton-based .   He scored 2 tries in 11 appearances in his first season with the Chiefs and despite injuries holding him back once more in domestic rugby, he was retained in the squad for 2017 and 2018.

Super Rugby Statistics

International

McNicol was a New Zealand Schools representative in 2013.

Post rugby playing career

In 2022 it was announced that McNicol would take up the role of rugby institute coach at St John's College, Hastings.  He was also a Hawke's Bay Rugby Union secondary schools rugby development officer.

References

1995 births
Living people
New Zealand rugby union players
Rugby union fullbacks
Rugby union wings
Wellington rugby union players
Hurricanes (rugby union) players
People educated at Napier Boys' High School
People from Feilding
Chiefs (rugby union) players
Hawke's Bay rugby union players
Rugby union centres
Rugby union players from Manawatū-Whanganui